The Washington micropolitan area may refer to:
The Washington, North Carolina micropolitan area, United States
The Washington, Indiana micropolitan area, United States
The Washington Court House, Ohio micropolitan area, United States

See also
Washington metropolitan area
Washington (disambiguation)